Sumu la Penzi is a Kenyan Swahili, melodrama that premiered in 2013 in Africa Magic Swahili. It has Serah Ndanu, Joyce Maina, Naomi Ng'ang'a and Judith Nyambura as the female leads.

Production
The show was produced by, Dorothy Ghettuba, the producer of Lies that Bind.Both of the television series, were produced by Spielswork media.

Plot
"Sumu la Penzi" follows the life of three urban women, their mishaps and their adventures as they prey on high-flying men of the city to fund their expensive lifestyles. These women, Mariam, Eva and Tindi trawl on social gatherings, bars and even their friends’ workplaces with their feminine charms, often scoring ridiculously rich married men of the city.
The central character, Mariam, is the elegant, classy go-getter who is dating three men at a go. She is the envy of every girl in town, a master of the game who is living the dream life. Her best friend is Eva, a banker who is dating a married man, and has had a daughter by him. She is drowning in delusions, believing that the man is in love with her and will leave his wife for her. In all this is Mariam's cousin, fresh electrical engineering graduate whose efforts to score a job has hit a dead end. Mentoring these girls on their ways is Ama, a bar manager at their favourite joint.

Cast

Main
Serah Ndanu as Mariam
Naomi Ng'ang'a as Ama
Avril as Eva  
Joyce Maina as Tindi

Supporting
Davidson Ngibuini as Tash
Pieter Desloovere as Hans
Peter Kawa as Oscar
Norbert Ouma as Solomon
Peterson Gathambo as Martin
Bilal Ndegwa as Mr Rent
Sherylene Mungai as Debrah
Lucy Waigera as Olive
Nina Adegala as Cynthia
Ainea Ojiambo as Victor

Guests
Antony Makau as business partner

Broadcast
Sumu la penzi premiered on September 17, 2013, in Africa Magic Swahili following its official launch on September 16, 2013.

The Soap opera also premiered on Maisha Magic Swahili. It is also airing on StarTimes Swahili, weeknights at 7:30 pm.

Awards and nominations

References

External links

2013 Kenyan television series debuts
English-language television shows
Swahili-language television shows
Kenyan television soap operas
2010s Kenyan television series
Africa Magic original programming